Niels Baunsøe (29 June 1939 – 12 March 2012) was a Danish cyclist. He competed in the team time trial at the 1960 Summer Olympics.

References

External links
 

1939 births
2012 deaths
Danish male cyclists
Olympic cyclists of Denmark
Cyclists at the 1960 Summer Olympics
Sportspeople from Frederiksberg